Ali Nijat Sirel (1897 Amasya – 1959 İstanbul) was a Turkish sculptor. The Bursa Atatürk Monument that he made in 1931 together with Mahir Tomruk is considered one of his best works. He is one of the first sculptors to take over monument sculpture in Turkey from foreigners. He is an important figure for Turkish sculpture as he and Mahir Tomruk are among the teachers to first educate the Republic-era Turkish sculptors.

In 1915, he was sent to Germany on a state scholarship to study sculpture. He was educated at the Munich Fine Arts Academy, after which he returned home.

In 1922, he started to work in Izmir High School as an art teacher. In 1927, he was appointed as a sculpture teacher at the Fine Arts Academy Istanbul and gave lessons alongside Rudolf Belling. In 1952, Sirel became the head of the academy.

He sculpted many monuments starting with the Bursa Atatürk Monument that he created with Mahir Tomruk in 1931. Following, he made the Çanakkale Atatürk Monument (1933), Kocaeli Ataturk Monument, Bolu Ataturk Monument, and together with Hakkı Atamulu the Atatürk and İnönü monuments in Malatya.

References

1897 births
People from Amasya
Academy of Fine Arts, Munich alumni
Turkish schoolteachers
Turkish male sculptors
Academy of Fine Arts in Istanbul alumni
Academic staff of Mimar Sinan Fine Arts University

1959 deaths